Freecom is a German manufacturer of computer peripherals. Its products include USB hard disks (where the actual hard drive is manufactured by Samsung and others), USB flash drives, USB DVB-T television receivers and a data recovery service. The original President and CEO was Dick C. Hoogerdijk and Managing Director is Axel Lucassen. It is the first company to release an external hard drive to USB 3.02 standards.

The company was founded in 1989 and sold to Mitsubishi Chemical / Verbatim in 2009.

References

External links
 Freecom

Companies established in 1989
Manufacturing companies of Germany